Hitoshi Narita is a  Japanese naval architect, researcher, businessman, and an International Fellow of the Royal Academy of Engineering (FREng).

For a time, Narita was one of the Managing Directors of Mitsui Engineering and Shipbuilding Co. in the 1990s. Dr. Narita is currently senior advisor for science and technology at the US Office of Naval Research's International Field Office, Asia. In this position, he coordinates partnerships between Japanese and American science and technology organizations.  Dr. Narita played a significant role in steps which led to establishing Japan-US joint participation projects, which meant Japan's National Institute of Advanced Industrial Science and Technology (AIST), 2001. began to partner with the US Naval Research Laboratory.

Early life
As a child growing up in Nagoya, Japan, he recalls having been fascinated by large mobile structures—airplanes, ships, trains—anything which was large, mechanical, and moved. He believes that his career interests were sparked by having watched the large cargo ships coming in and out of the ports near his home.

Education
 University of Tokyo, B.A. in Naval architecture.
 Massachusetts Institute of Technology (Fulbright Scholarship), M.A. in Naval architecture.
 University of Tokyo, Ph.D. in Engineering.

Career
At Mitsui Engineering and Shipbuilding|Mitsui Engineering and Shipbuilding Co., Narita started out in ship design, and went on to work in research and development.

Narita developed the world's first use of the catamaran-like design for large commercial ferries—the "small waterplane area twin hull" or SWATH configuration.  The demonstrated stability and seaworthiness of these ferries led to the increased use of a similar vessel design in contexts, including naval ships, oceanographic survey ships, pleasure crafts and sightseeing boats.

Narita lead the team developing the novel Mitsui Integrated Duct Propeller (MIDP), which was designed to increase fuels saving in large ships.  The MIDP effectively mitigated the constant erosion caused by cavitation from the ship's propeller on the conventional propeller duct by moving the duct forward and by realigning a non-symmetrical duct adapted to the stern flow.  The MIDP increased propeller efficiency and virtually eliminated the shipyard downtime which was formerly necessary for repairing  the erosion problems.  The substantial fuel savings has been demonstrated in over 200 ships, including all of Exxon's Very Large Crude Carriers.  New ships have been incorporated MIDP in their design, and older ships have been retrofitted.

In the 1990s, Narita was given broader responsibility for managing Research and Development, as well as business development at Mitsui Engineering & Shipbuilding. During this period, Japanese ocean-going shipbuilding industry has evolved into two distinct sectors and today's second tier or medium-sized firms build close to half the nation's output of large ocean-going vessels.  Narita was well-positioned to monitor this diversification in the industry.

In 2002, Narita's contributions to naval architecture—particularly the SWATH configuration and the MIDP assembly—were recognized by his election to Fellowship of the Royal Academy of Engineering, joining an elite group of only 86 other Foreign Members in the Royal Academy.  The Royal Academy of Engineering's 2002 "New Fellows' Dinner" took place at the Drapers' Hall, Throgmorton Street in London; and pre-dinner photos commemorating this gala event were organized in the Drapers' formal Drawing Room.

Honors
 International Fellow of the Royal Academy of Engineering (FREng), 2002.

 , purple ribbon, 1990.
 Medal of the Minister of Transport, 1989.
 Medal of the Kanto District Marine Bureau, 1988.
 Ichimura Prize, 1981.

Notes

References
 Koenig, Philip C., Hitoshi Narita and Koichi Baba. (2001). [http://cat.inist.fr/?aModele=afficheN&cpsidt=13495027  "Strategies and outcomes in the two sectors of the Japanese shipbuilding industry,] Journal of ship production. Vol. 17, No. 3, pp. 174–182. (published by the Society of Naval Architects and Marine Engineers)
 Narita, Hitoshi and Philip Koenig,  "Austal Ships and Incat Australia: Shipbuilding Competitiveness via Product Differentiation and Focus"', Shipbuilding and Ocean Technology: Asia-Pacific Region.'' (published by the U.S. Navy, Office of Naval Research International Field Office in Tokyo).
 ___. (1962).  A Step Response Analysis of Damping and Virtual Inertia of a Pitching Ship.  Cambridge: Massachusetts Institute of Technology Press. [OCLC  12965336]

Year of birth missing (living people)
Living people
Massachusetts Institute of Technology alumni
Japanese naval architects
Fellows of the Royal Academy of Engineering
People from Nagoya